Cue sports at the 2009 East Asian Games was held at the Hong Kong International Trade and Exhibition Centre from 3 to 7 December 2009. A total of 8 events were contested.

Medal table

Medalists

Men

Women

Results

Men

Snooker singles

Snooker team

Six-red snooker singles

English billiard singles

Nine-ball singles

One-cushion singles

Women

Six-red snooker singles

Nine-ball singles

References

cue sports
Cue sports at multi-sport events
Cue sports in Hong Kong
2009 in cue sports
2009 in snooker